Miles! Miles! Miles! Live in Japan '81 is an album by Miles Davis, released exclusively in Japan in 1993. It contains recordings from the October 4, 1981 concert in Tokyo, some of which had appeared on We Want Miles, including the original version of the track "Jean-Pierre", elsewhere edited by producer Teo Macero to remove the first twenty-five seconds of introduction, consisting primarily of a guitar riff and percussion.

Track listing 
Sony Music Japan – SRCS 6513-4

Personnel 
Musicians
 Miles Davis – trumpet, Keyboard
 Bill Evans – soprano saxophone
 Mike Stern – electric guitar
 Marcus Miller – electric bass
 Al Foster – drums
 Mino Cinelu – percussion

Production
 Motoaki Uehara – coordinator
 Tomoo Suzuki – engineer (mixing)
 Kazumi Sugiura – engineer (mastering)
 Hideki Sawa – art direction
 Katuji Abe – photography
 Shigeru Uchiyama – photography

References 

Miles Davis live albums
1981 live albums